Anbar-e Olya (also Romanized as Anbār-e ‘Olyā; also known as Anbār-e Naneh and Anbār-e Bālā) is a village in Chaldoran-e Jonubi Rural District, in the Central District of Chaldoran County, West Azerbaijan Province, Iran. At the 2006 census, its population was 129, in 20 families.

References 

Populated places in Chaldoran County